Municipio II is an administrative subdivision of the city of Rome.

It was first created by Rome's City Council on 19 January 2001 and it has a President who is elected during the mayoral elections. On 11 March 2013 its borders were modified and it has expanded with the incorporation of part of the abolished Municipio III.

Subdivision
Municipio II is divided into 11 localities:

Municipal Government
The President of the municipio is directly elected by citizens. The Council of the municipio is elected every five years, with a system under which voters express a direct choice for the President or an indirect choice voting for the party of the candidate's coalition. If no candidate receives at least 50% of votes, the top two candidates go to a second round after two weeks. This gives a result whereby the winning candidate may be able to claim majority support.

Last election occurred on 5 and 19 June 2016:

Table below shows the current composition of the Council:

Here is a list of the Presidents of the municipio since the office was created in 2001:

References

 
Municipi of Rome